Tyogro-Ozero is a rural locality (a settlement) in Velsky District, Arkhangelsk Oblast, Russia. The population was 1,526 as of 2010. There are 9 streets.

Geography 
Tyogro-Ozero is located 140 km northwest of Velsk (the district's administrative centre) by road. Verkhopuysky is the nearest rural locality.

References 

Rural localities in Velsky District